The Lemon Party of Canada was a frivolous Canadian political party which has operated on a federal level, and provincially in Quebec.  The party was registered on January 8, 1987 by then-leader Denis R. Patenaude, and deregistered on November 14, 1998 for failing to have at least ten candidates stand for election.  The party was headed by "Pope Terence the First", whose existence is unconfirmed.  Their official agent is Mary-Gabrielle Blay II.

Its 2004 national convention produced a platform of policies which were "placed in small green plastic boxes and sold to industrial pig farms in Mexico", according to a large party spokeswoman. The subsequent electoral campaign, under the slogan "For a bitter Canada", received minor, but sympathetic, media coverage. Its last press release was published online five days prior to the 2006 Canadian elections, ridiculing both Liberal Paul Martin and Conservative Stephen Harper. The Lemon Party prided itself on its record on fiscal discipline and in pushing for economic growth. Its economic plan was allegedly authored by Montreal economist Ianik Marcil.

The Lemon Party has not been registered as a political party since the early 1990s, when it was registered only in Quebec.

Policies and platforms 
The Lemon Party pledged to:

 Restructure Canada's economy to be centred on lemon production
 Support global warming so lemons can be grown in Canada
 Abolish Toronto
 Repeal the law of gravity
 Merge the Great Lakes

Election results

See also
 List of frivolous parties
 Politics of Quebec
 Political parties in Quebec
 List of political parties in Canada

References

Federal political parties in Canada
Joke political parties in Canada
Political parties established in 1987
Defunct provincial political parties in Quebec
Defunct political parties in Canada
Political parties disestablished in 1998
1987 establishments in Quebec
1998 disestablishments in Canada